Deceit is a British television mystery thriller miniseries, based on the 1993 novel of the same name by Clare Francis, that first broadcast on BBC One on 2 April 2000. Stuart Orme served as director, while Nicolas Brown served as producer. The miniseries, which stars Francesca Annis, Peter O'Brien and Christopher Fulford, follows housewife Ellen Richmond (Annis), whose husband mysteriously disappears after going out sailing on his yacht.

The series was partly filmed in and around Ipswich. Critical reception to the series was positive. The series was remade as an American television movie with the same title in 2004. Notably, the series has never been released on VHS or DVD; however it is often repeated on True Entertainment as part of their "Best of British" season.

Cast
 Francesca Annis as Ellen Richmond
 Peter O'Brien as Richard Moreland
 Christopher Fulford as Jack Crawford
 James Hazeldine as Henry Richmond
 David Horovitch as Inspector Dawson
 Ger Ryan as Molly Sinclair
 Sammy Glenn as Katie Richmond
 David Schaal as Leo Braithwaite
 Elaine Claxton as Mrs. Anderson
 Jacqueline Cotter as Jill Hooper
 Angela Douglas as Anne Barlow
 Carmel Howard as WDC Owen
 Helene Kvale as Caroline Palmer
 Jon Laurimore as Gordon Critchley
 Charlie Lucas as Josh Richmond
 Tom Lucy as Colin Atkins
 William Oliver as Tim Schwartz
 Philip Pickard as PC Willis
 Paul Ridley as Charles

Episodes

References

External links
 

2000 British television series debuts
2000 British television series endings
2000s British drama television series
2000s British television miniseries
BBC television dramas
English-language television shows
Television shows based on British novels
British thriller television series